GDCA may refer to:
Global Digital Currency Association
Game Developers Choice Awards
General Department of Civil Aviation of Armenia